The toonie (also spelled twonie or twoonie), formally the Canadian two-dollar coin (nicknamed  or ), was introduced on February 19, 1996, by Minister of Public Works Diane Marleau.  it possesses the highest monetary value of any circulating Canadian coin. The toonie is a bi-metallic coin which on the reverse side bears an image of a polar bear by artist Brent Townsend. The obverse, like all other current Canadian circulation coins, has a portrait of Queen Elizabeth II. It has the words  in a typeface different from any other Canadian coin.

The coin is manufactured using a patented distinctive bi-metallic coin-locking mechanism. The coins are estimated to last 20 years. The discontinued two-dollar bill was less expensive to manufacture but lasted only one year on average.

On April 10, 2012, the Royal Canadian Mint (RCM) announced design changes to the loonie and toonie, which include new security features.

Coins minted prior to 2012 consist of an aluminum bronze inner core with a pure nickel outer ring; but in March–May 2012, the composition of the inner core switched to aluminum bronze coated with multi-ply plated brass, and the outer ring switched to steel coated with multi-ply plated nickel. The weight dropped from 7.30 to 6.92g, and the thickness changed from 1.8 to 1.75 mm. The Mint said that multi-ply plated steel technology, already used in Canada's smaller coinage, produces an electromagnetic signature that is harder to counterfeit than that of regular alloy coins; also, using steel provides cost savings and avoids fluctuations in the price or supply of nickel.

Naming
"Toonie" is a portmanteau word combining the number "two" with the name of the loonie, Canada's one-dollar coin. It is occasionally spelled "twonie" or "twoonie", but Canadian newspapers and the Royal Canadian Mint use the "toonie" spelling.

Jack Iyerak Anawak, member of Parliament from Nunatsiaq (the electoral district representing what is now the territory of Nunavut), suggested the name "Nanuq" [nanook, polar bear] in honour of the Inuit and their northern culture; however, this proposal went largely unnoticed beside the popular "toonie".

The name "toonie" became so widely accepted that in 2006, the RCM secured the rights to it. A competition to name the bear resulted in the name "Churchill", a reference both to Winston Churchill and to the common polar bear sightings in Churchill, Manitoba.

Launch
Finance Minister Paul Martin announced the replacement of the $2 banknote with a coin in the 1995 Canadian federal budget speech. The RCM spent  to canvass 2,000 Canadian households regarding which of the 10 theme options they preferred.

Under the direction of Hieu C. Truong, the RCM engineering division designed the two-dollar coin to be made from two different metals. The metals for the bimetallic coin would be lighter and thinner than those produced anywhere in the world. To join the two parts, the engineering division selected a bimechanical locking mechanism. By the end of 1996, the Winnipeg facility had struck 375 million of these coins. The coin was officially launched at Ben's Deli in Montreal on February 19, 1996.

The community of Campbellford, Ontario, home to the coin's designer, constructed an  toonie monument, similar to the "Big Loonie" in Echo Bay and the Big Nickel in Sudbury.

Unlike the loonie before it, the toonie and the $2 bill were not produced concurrently with each other, as the $2 bill was withdrawn from circulation on February 16, 1996, three days prior to the toonie's introduction.

Commemorative editions

Specimen set editions
From 2010 to 2015, the Royal Canadian Mint issued a two-dollar coin that depicts a different and unique image of a young animal on the coin's reverse. These special toonies have limited mintages and are available only in the six-coin specimen sets.

First strikes

Separation of metals
A failure in the bimetallic locking mechanism in the first batch of toonies caused some coins to separate if struck hard or frozen. Despite media reports of defective toonies, the RCM responded that the odds of a toonie falling apart were about one in 60 million. Deliberately attempting to separate a toonie is considered to be "defacing coin currency", a summary offence under section 456 of the Canadian Criminal Code.

See also

 Newfoundland 2-dollar coin (antedating Canada's coin)

References

External links
Jack Iyerak Anawak on Two-Dollar Coin - Hansard April 26th, 1996

1996 establishments in Canada
Coins of Canada
Bi-metallic coins
Two-base-unit coins
Bears in art
Currencies introduced in 1996